Iván Nagy (January 23, 1938 – March 23, 2015) was a Hungarian film and television director best known for directing films such as Bad Charleston Charlie, Skinner, and Deadly Hero. Nagy also directed episodes of the TV series CHiPs, Starsky & Hutch, and The Hitchhiker.

Nagy was a convicted bookmaker, and was the former boyfriend of Hollywood madam Heidi Fleiss. He was featured in the documentary Heidi Fleiss: Hollywood Madam.

References

External links
 
 

1938 births
2015 deaths
Hungarian film directors
Hungarian television directors
Bookmakers